Grier Raggio is an American attorney and politician. He was a Democratic candidate in the 2010 election for the United States House of Representatives seat in Texas's 32nd congressional district. The race had been named by The Hill as one of ten dark horse races in the nation.

Personal
Raggio was born in Elgin, Texas and moved to Dallas shortly after his father returned home from service in World War II. Both of his parents were attorneys and his mother Louise was a national leader in securing the equal rights of women before the law. Raggio's wife Lorraine is a Civil District Court Judge in Dallas County. He has three children and two grandchildren.

Education and professional life
Raggio attended Highland Park High School, where he was class president and an Eagle Scout, before going on to Harvard University. Upon graduating, Raggio attended the University of Texas School of Law before finishing his Juris Doctor at Boston College.

He started several small businesses and a law firm in New York City before returning to Dallas to join his family's law practice.

Campaign
Raggio formally announced his candidacy in June 2009.

Raggio ran a campaign premised on accountability and transparency, promising to pursue comprehensive ethics reform. A committed environmentalist, he believes that the United States should commit itself to reducing fossil fuel consumption by 50% before 2020.

Raggio's campaign was hurt by a national environment in which Republicans, led by Raggio's opponent NRCC Chairman Pete Sessions, saw massive gains nationwide and in Texas. On November 2, 2010, Raggio was defeated 63%-35%.

References

External links
Campaign website
Environmental Blog

Living people
People from Dallas
Texas Democrats
Harvard University alumni
University of Texas School of Law alumni
Year of birth missing (living people)